The Coalition Against Insurance Fraud is a coalition of insurance organizations, consumers, government agencies and legislative bodies working to enact anti-fraud legislation, educate the public, and provide anti-fraud advice. They are also a resource where consumers can find scam warnings, learn where to report fraud, and how to protect themselves. 
 
The Coalition was founded in 1993 after several organizations reported a heavy rise in insurance fraud and a need to stop it.

History 
In 1993, insurance fraud investigators staged several bus crashes in New Jersey. The only passengers in the busses were fraud investigators. After the crash, they received over 100 claims from people who jumped on the bus after it crashed or simply drove by the scene and wanted to claim insurance money saying they were injured.
 
In response to this problem, seventeen organizations formed The Coalition Against Insurance Fraud, contributing $500,000 to finance anti-fraud efforts. At the time, The Coalition estimated that auto fraud cost over $8 billion a year in overpaid claims.
 
Since then, The Coalition has grown to include over 90 members, including GEICO, National Consumers League, First Acceptance Corp., Healthcare Insight, Property Casualty Insurers Assoc. of America, SAS Institute, Thomson Reuters, Nationwide, and the Virginia State Police.

Mission 
The Coalition's main mission is to fight insurance fraud. The Coalition seeks to unite and empower private and public groups against fraud. Members work to control insurance costs, protect public safety, and reduce crime.

Three main areas of activity are:

Government Affairs
 To enact stronger anti-fraud laws through local and grassroots campaigns
 Create model bills. For example, establishing insurance fraud as a specific crime.
 Strengthen anti-fraud bills 
 Hold major summits
 Support prosecutions

 Communication 
 Raise public awareness of insurance fraud, and how public can fight back
 Empower and alert consumers 
 Unite outreach efforts

Research
 Sponsor major research and surveys

Publications 
 Journal of Insurance Fraud in America (JIFA), a quarterly publication containing in-depth analysis of trends, research, and public policy issues that may impact anti-fraud efforts
 FraudWire, two quarterly digital publications reporting on important developments involving legislative activity and public awareness
 Fraud News Weekly, a paid digital publication summarizing weekly trends on legislative and regulatory developments, state and federal court decisions, public outreach and media coverage, the week's fraud arrests, the latest convictions for insurance fraud, civil cases, administrative actions, upcoming meetings, seminars & conferences.
 Get a Grip on Fraud: Fraud Awareness Manual, an action guide for creating memorable fraud-awareness events

Research 
The Coalition has published several research studies over the past decade. Among them:
 Effectiveness of warnings on benefit checks, in 2000, selected insurance companies writing workers compensation coverage in the United States were surveyed to determine their experience and perceptions with printed warnings on the back of benefit checks.
 Four faces: why Americans do and don't tolerate fraud, to understand why people accept fraud, and why individuals sometimes won't report fraud even though they understand fraud raises everyone's premiums. Study includes focus groups and statistical survey. conducted to gain insight on why public tolerance of insurance fraud seems to be increasing. Both qualitative and quantitive research was used to attempt to understand how public attitudes about fraud are formed and what factors influence them.
 Insurer fraud measurement, a survey completed by 65 Special Investigative Unit managers, mostly from property/casualty insurers, on their practices involving measuring anti-fraud activities for case referrals, fraud savings and performance evaluations of investigators.
 Prescription for Peril, examining unreported and elusive aspects of drug diversion, the role insurance fraud pays in financing prescription abuse, and the high cost to insurers and consumers.
 Special Investigative Unit study, conducted to learn how insurers measure the performance of their Special Investigative Units. A review of the measurement systems of 52 insurers found there is little consistency from insurer to insurer in the methods they use in their performance systems.
 State Insurance Fraud Bureau Survey, a snapshot of state agencies’ fraud fight by the numbers, aimed at understanding the structure, responsibility, and overall activity of insurance fraud across the United States

Fraud Warnings 
The Coalition issues scam alerts for common schemes, elaborating on variations and best measures for prevention and defense.
Among the topics:

 Agents and insurers: Though most insurers and agents are honest, the Coalition warns against agents who pocket their clients' premiums, sell insurance that is fake or unnecessary, or provide unneeded coverage to boost premiums.
 Airbags: Counterfeit airbags have been flooding the markets and posing a deadly threat to innocent motorists. 
 Auto repairs: Auto repair scams have been known to involve purposely damaging cars in order to inflate repair costs, padding existing repairs, or cutting corners by doing low-quality work.
 Bogus health plans: A tough economy can make individuals more vulnerable to buying too-good-to-be-true insurance plans
 Contractors & adjusters: The Coalition warns against fraudulent contractors who appear after natural disasters to offer repairs, fraudulent contractors may add damage to increase costs, illegally lower deductibles, receive pay and disappear, or do work without a license. 
 Dental: Dental schemes often involve billing for treatment that was never provided, or providing treatment that was not needed
 Discount medical cards: these cards offer discounted medical treatment or pills, but fake cards may provide no coverage or discounts
 Drug diversion. The abuse of prescription drugs.
 Medical identity theft: Medical identity schemes involve stealing someone's social security number, medicare number, medicaid number, and other identifying information in order to file insurance claims on their behalf for illegal gain.
 Staged auto crashes: The Coalition warns against people who claim nonexistent injuries after crashes in order to exploit their insurance coverage, fraudsters may purposely crash into unsuspecting drivers, or stage a crash that is entirely set-up in person or on paper.
 Workers' compensation:''' The Coalition warns against employers who do not purchase adequate coverage for their employees, and employees who fake injuries for paid time off.

References

External links

Investment Fraud Fund Recovery

Consumer fraud
Fraud in the United States
1993 establishments in the United States
Insurance fraud